Cabaret Woman (Spanish:Una mujer de cabaret) is a 1974 Spanish comedy film directed by Pedro Lazaga and starring Carmen Sevilla and José María Rodero.

Cast
 Carmen Sevilla as Rita Medina  
 José María Rodero as Adolfo Muntaner  
 Ágata Lys as Laura 
 Norma Duval as Adolfo's companion

References

Bibliography
 Mira, Alberto. The A to Z of Spanish Cinema. Rowman & Littlefield, 2010.

External links 

1974 films
Spanish comedy films
1974 comedy films
1970s Spanish-language films
Films directed by Pedro Lazaga
Films scored by Augusto Algueró
1970s Spanish films